Wayne Miranda (born 3 July 1957) is an Australian former rugby league footballer who played in the 1970s and 1980s. He played for Balmain in the New South Wales Rugby League (NSWRL) competition.

Background
Miranda was born in Sydney, New South Wales, Australia and played his junior rugby league for Birchgrove Scorpions. Miranda is the son of Ray Miranda who played for Balmain in the 1940s.

Playing career
Miranda made his first grade debut for Balmain in Round 1 1978 against Penrith at Leichhardt Oval kicking 5 goals in a 16-8 victory. Between 1979 and 1982, Miranda finished as the club's top point scorer. Balmain continued to struggle on the field during those years and finished last in 1981.  

In 1983, Balmain finished 4th on the table and qualified for the finals.  Balmain were defeated in the semi final by St George 17-14.  Miranda departed the club at the end of 1983 and finished as Balmain's 5th highest point scorer with 541 points.

References

1957 births
Living people
Balmain Tigers players
Australian rugby league players
Rugby league players from Sydney
Rugby league fullbacks
Rugby league wingers
Rugby league centres